Tosca is an opera by Giacomo Puccini.

Tosca may also refer to:

Entertainment
 Tosca (1953 EMI recording), a recording of Puccini's opera conducted by Victor de Sabata
 Tosca (1941 film), an Italian film by Carl Koch
 Tosca (1956 film), an Italian musical melodrama film
 Tosca (2001 film), a French drama film
 Tosca (band), Austrian electronic band

Science and technology
 TOSCA or TSCA, US Toxic Substances Control Act of 1976
 OASIS TOSCA (Topology and Orchestration Specification for Cloud Applications), a cloud computing standard
 Tricentis Tosca, a software testing tool
 TOSCA, a neutron spectrometer at the ISIS neutron source
 Project TOSCA (Toolbox for Surface Comparison and Analysis), a research project at the Technion – Israel Institute of Technology

Other uses
 La Tosca, an 1887 play by Victorien Sardou, from which Puccini's opera was adapted
 La Tosca (disambiguation), several films based on Sardou's play
 Daewoo Tosca, an automobile model
 Uva Tosca or Tosca, a grape varietal
 Tosca (moth), a genus of moth
 Tosca, a fragrance by Mäurer & Wirtz
 Tosca, a Michelin-starred restaurant in The Ritz-Carlton, Hong Kong
 Tosca, North West

People
 Carlos Tosca (born 1953), sport manager
 Tosca Kramer (1903–1976), violinist
 Tosca Lee (born 1969), author
 Tosca Musk (born 1974), filmmaker
 Tosca Reno (born 1959), fitness and nutrition author
 Tosca (born 1967), Italian singer and actress

See also

 La Tosca Flats, an historic building in Cincinnati, Ohio, U.S.
 Sangiovese or Uva Tosca, a grape varietal
Tosia, name
Toska (disambiguation)